Julie-Anne Staehli (born December 21, 1993) is a Canadian Olympian, professional track and field athlete, and runner representing Team New Balance Boston, specializing in the 5,000 m event.

Early life 
Julie-Anne grew up on a farm outside of the small town of Lucknow, Ontario, where she began running on the backroads. Over the course of her elementary and high school years, she participated in various sports, including cross-country running, skiing and snowboarding in the fall/winter and track, triathlon and soccer in the summer. Running became the focus in her senior year of high school when she led her team to an OFSAA cross country title and won the individual gold in the 1,500m steeplechase.

Running Career 
In 2012, Julie-Anne moved to Kingston, ON, to attend Queen's University. During her five years as a varsity athlete, she achieved 12 podium finishes, becoming the first 5-Time All Canadian in the history of the school, and made her first National Team, representing Canada at the 2014 FISU World University Cross Country Championships. At the 2014 NACAC U23 Championships in Athletics in Kamloops, Staehli won the bronze medal in the 3000 metres steeplechase. 

Since then, Julie-Anne has made 5 Senior National Teams and made the Canada's 2020 Olympic team in the women's 5,000 metres at the Tokyo 2020 Olympic Games. She moved to Boston in the fall of 2021 to run professionally with Team New Balance Boston and has recently competed at the 2022 World Indoor Championships and Commonwealth Games. Julie-Anne competed at the Tokyo 2020 Olympic Games in the 5,000m, is the Canadian record holder in the indoor 2 Mile, has the second fastest Canadian indoor 3,000m and is the 4th fastest Canadian of all time in the 5,000m. She is also a two-time Canadian Champion (2021 Olympic Trials / 2022 5K Road Championships). 

Julie-Anne represented Canada in events worldwide, including the Commonwealth Games, World Indoor Championships, World Cross Country Championships, Pan American Cross Country Cup, NACAC Track Championships, and the FISU World Cross Country Championships.

Education 
Alongside Julie-Anne's running career, she completed her Bachelor of Arts Honours in Health Studies at the School of Kinesiology and Health Studies, Queen’s University (2016), her Master of Science in Sport Psychology, specializing in team leadership and organization in the high-performance sport context, from the School of Kinesiology and Health Studies at Queen’s University (2020), and her Bachelor of Education, Intermediate-Senior at Western University (2021).

Coaching

Queen's University (2014-2017) 
Julie-Anne initially began her coaching and mentoring opportunities at Queen's University in 2014 as a Student-Athlete Academic Mentor with the Queen's University Athlete Services assisting first-year student-athletes transitioning from high school to university in both their academics and athletics. Between 2013-2017, Julie-Anne was also heavily involved with the Queen's University Varsity Leadership Council as a Team Lead, supporting fundraisers and volunteer programs in the Kingston, Ontario, community. In 2017, Julie-Anne stepped into an Assistant Cross Country Coach role with the Queen's University Gaels. Throughout her university career, she was also the Head Lifeguard and Advanced Instructor with the Queen's University Athletics & Recreation facility, teaching beginner and advanced swim lessons.

Western University (2018-2019) 
Julie-Anne Staehli entered her first season as Assistant Coach of the Western Mustang’s Cross Country Team for the 2018-19 season.

The ReRUN Shoe Project 
Co-Founded alongside Kurtis Marlow, Julie-Anne started The ReRUN Shoe Project in 2016 to get shoes in the hands of Canadians in need who might not otherwise have a quality pair of shoes to participate in an active lifestyle. By establishing ongoing drop-off locations where runners can bring their lightly used shoes, The ReRUN Shoe Project hopes to connect with fellow athletes and help them give back to their local communities. In doing so, together, they look to reduce, reuse, and pass on the gift of running.

Awards and Honours 

 Alfie Pierce Trophy (March 2013) - Top Female Athlete (Track) in first year with biggest contribution to Queen’s University.
 Outstanding Performance of the Year Award (March 2014) - Student Athlete (Cross Country/Track) who brought the most honour and recognition to Queen's University, resulting from success in provincial, national and international competition.
 Dean's Honour List with Distinction (April 2015 – April 2016) - Designated as having a GPA of 3.50 or greater and in the top 3% of all students within the degree program*, based on the combined grade for all courses taken.
 Five-Time All-Canadian Honour (November 2016) - First 5-time All-Canadian Student-Athlete in the history of Queen's University, achieving a Top-14 finish at every Canadian University Championship (2012-2016).
 SSHRC Joseph Armand Bombardier Canada Graduate Scholarship - Master's (December 2016) - High-caliber scholars engaged in a master’s program in Canada to develop research skills and assist in the training of highly qualified personnel by supporting students who demonstrate a high standard of achievement in undergraduate and graduate studies.
 PHE '55 Alumnae Award (March 2017) - Graduating Varsity Female Athlete (Cross Country) who brought the most honour to Queen’s University, displaying qualities of scholastic achievement, competitiveness, leadership, sportsmanship, dedication, and exceptional contributions to her team.
 3x Academic All-Star and Academic USPORTS All-Canadian (2015, 2016 and 2017) - Student-Athlete who competed at the provincial/national championships and attained an average of 80% or greater.
 Lyle Makosky Values and Ethics in Sport Fund (September 2017) - Sport research scholarship to support the study of current values, ethics-based challenges and related policies affecting Canadian sport.
 The Saint John Jeux Canada Games Foundation Award (October 2017 and April 2019) - Athlete with potential to be among the best in Canada, having demonstrated dedication to their sport and have special needs not covered through regular program funding.
 Alberta O’Neil Award in Physical Education (June 2021) - Awarded as a Bachelor of Education graduate based on academic excellence and proficiency in Physical Education.

Theses and Dissertations 

 Staehli, J., Martin, L.M., Côté, J. (2018). A Blueprint for Student-Athlete Success: Understanding the Conditions Implemented by High Performance Coaches. Paper presented at the Eastern Canada Sport and Exercise Psychology Symposium, Montreal, QC, Canada.
 Staehli, J., Martin, L.J, & Côté, J. (2021). Condition Setting in Sport: A Case Study Approach to Explore Program Planning by Canadian University Coaches. International Sport Coaching Journal, 9(1).

References

External links
World Athletics profile

1993 births
Living people
Canadian female track and field athletes
People from Goderich, Ontario
People from Bruce County
Athletes (track and field) at the 2020 Summer Olympics
Olympic track and field athletes of Canada
20th-century Canadian women
21st-century Canadian women